Sir Cyril Fred Fox  (16 December 1882 – 15 January 1967) was an English archaeologist and museum director.

Fox became keeper of archaeology at the National Museum of Wales, and subsequently served as director from 1926 to 1948. His most notable achievements were collaborative. With his second wife, Aileen Fox, he surveyed and excavated several prehistoric monuments in Wales. With Iorwerth Peate, he established the Welsh Folk Museum at St Fagans, and with Lord Raglan, he authored a definitive history of vernacular architecture, Monmouthshire Houses.

Early life
Sir Cyril Fred Fox was born in Chippenham, Wiltshire, and his first job, at the age of 16, was as a gardener. He was educated at Christ's Hospital school.

Career
Prior to his appointment as Director of the National Museum of Wales in 1926, Fox served as a clerk in a government commission on tuberculosis and then as director of a small research station in Cambridge. He moved to work part-time for the university's museum of archaeology and anthropology, and he completed a Ph.D thesis, entitled Archaeology of the Cambridge Region. This work was published under the same title in 1923, and met with immediate success, with his election to a Fellow of the Society of Antiquaries in the same year. In 1922, he was appointed curator of archaeology at the National Museum of Wales by his close friend Mortimer Wheeler and in 1926 succeeded Wheeler as its Director. He produced a remarkable range of publications. They include The Personality of Britain (1932), drawing attention to the differences between upland and lowland Britain; Offa's Dyke (1955), a seminal study of that great earthwork, and studies on Celtic Art, on the major discovery of early ironwork at Llyn Cerrig Bach in Anglesey; and Monmouthshire Houses, co-authored with Lord Raglan. For his administrative and scholarly work he gained a wide range of honours, including a knighthood (1935) and Fellowship of the British Academy (1940). Together with his colleague Nash-Williams at the Museum of Wales, he collaborated with the artist Alan Sorrell on reconstruction drawings of the Roman excavations at Caerwent which were published in the Illustrated London News 1937–1942. Among other achievements, he encouraged his colleague Iorwerth Peate in the development of what became in 1946, under Peate's direction, the Welsh Folk Museum at St Fagans, near Cardiff (now the St Fagans National History Museum).

Personal life
Fox married firstly, Olive Congreve-Pridgeon, with whom he had two daughters. After her death in 1932, he married Aileen Scott-Henderson, another archaeologist. They had three sons. The family lived at Four Elms, a house in Rhiwbina Garden Village, in the north of Cardiff from 1928 until Fox’s retirement in 1948. They then moved to Exeter, Devon, following Aileen’s appoint to a post at the University of Exeter. Fox died in 1967.

References

External links
 Oxford DNB index entry

English archaeologists
Members of the Cambrian Archaeological Association
1882 births
1967 deaths
People from Chippenham
Knights Bachelor
People associated with Amgueddfa Cymru – Museum Wales
People educated at Christ's Hospital
Fellows of the Society of Antiquaries of London
Fellows of the British Academy
Presidents of the Society of Antiquaries of London